Shaheed Mohtarma Benazir Bhutto Medical University (SMBBMU), established on July 9, 2009, is a public university of medicine, Nursing, Pharmacy and allied health sciences located in Larkana, Sindh, Pakistan.

The university is named after Benazir Bhutto who was twice the Prime Minister of Pakistan. Professor Doctor Sikandar Ali Sheikh became its first vice-chancellor.

Its constituent colleges are:

 Chandka Medical College, Larkana (CMC)
 Ghulam Muhammad Mahar Medical College (GMMMC), Sukkur
 Gambat Institute of Medical Sciences, Gambat (GIMS)
 Bibi Aseefa Dental College, Larkana (BADC)
 Benazir Institute Of Nursing and Community Health Sciences, Larkana

See also
 Mohtarma Benazir Bhutto Shaheed Medical College
 Shaheed Benazir Bhutto Medical College
 Shaheed Benazir Bhutto City University in Karachi
 Shaheed Benazir Bhutto Dewan University in Karachi
 Shaheed Benazir Bhutto University of Veterinary & Animal Sciences in Sakrand, Sindh
 Benazir Bhutto Shaheed University (Karachi) in Karachi, Sindh
 Shaheed Benazir Bhutto University (Sheringal) in Dir, Khyber Pakhtunkhwa
 Shaheed Benazir Bhutto University (Shaheed Benazirabad) in Shaheed Benazirabad, Sindh
 Shaheed Benazir Bhutto Women University, previously known as the Frontier Women University, in Peshawar, Khyber Pakhtunkhwa

References

External links
 

Medical colleges in Sindh
Larkana District
Public universities and colleges in Sindh
Memorials to Benazir Bhutto